Hugo Valencia (born 19 May 1953) is a Mexican former swimmer. He competed in three events at the 1972 Summer Olympics.

References

External links
 

1953 births
Living people
Mexican male swimmers
Olympic swimmers of Mexico
Swimmers at the 1972 Summer Olympics
Place of birth missing (living people)